Maple Court Apartments is a historic apartment building at 1115-1133 Maple Avenue in Evanston, Illinois. The three-story brick building was built in 1915. Architect George S. Kingsley gave the building a geometrical design similar to those used in Prairie School buildings, though the building is not itself Prairie School. The building's design includes patterned brickwork, limestone arches and windowsills, and parapets with decorative sunbursts. The U-shaped building surrounds an open courtyard, a common feature of Evanston's apartment buildings.

The building was added to the National Register of Historic Places on March 15, 1984.

References

Buildings and structures on the National Register of Historic Places in Cook County, Illinois
Residential buildings on the National Register of Historic Places in Illinois
Buildings and structures in Evanston, Illinois
Apartment buildings in Illinois
Residential buildings completed in 1915